National Highway 731A, commonly referred to as NH 731A is a national highway in  India. It is a spur road of National Highway 31. NH-731A traverses the state of Uttar Pradesh in India.

Route 
Pratapgarh - Jethwara - Shrangverpur - Manjhanpur - Rajapur - Chitrakoot.

Junctions  

  Terminal near Pratapgarh.
  near Lalgopalganj
  near Muratganj
  near Rajapur
  Terminal near Chitrakoot.

See also 

 List of National Highways in India
 List of National Highways in India by state

References

External links 

 NH 731A on OpenStreetMap

National highways in India
National Highways in Uttar Pradesh